Vytautas Nekrošius (born 1970) is a Lithuanian politician and civil legal scholar,  PhD, Professor at the Faculty of Law of Vilnius University, the Faculty of Law’s, since 2016 president of the Lithuania Lawyers Association (LLA). He is to replace  Ignas Vėgėlė, Chairman of the Council of the Lithuanian Bar Association. Since 2019 Nekrošius is a member of Councel of Molėtai District Municipality.

Member of Lithuanian Green Party.

Education 
In 1993 Vytautas Nekrošius graduated from Vilnius University, the Faculty of Law. In 1994 he was awarded an LL.M.  from Goethe University Frankfurt in Germany.  He was enrolled as a doctoral student and obtained a PhD in social sciences, for the doctor thesis and after habilitation thesis in civil procedure law.

Award 
Order for Merits to Lithuania

References 

1970 births
Lithuanian municipal councillors
Lithuanian Green Party politicians
People from Molėtai District Municipality
Lithuanian legal scholars
Scholars of civil procedure law
Lawyers from Vilnius
Knight's Crosses of the Order for Merits to Lithuania
Goethe University Frankfurt alumni
Vilnius University alumni
Living people
20th-century Lithuanian lawyers
21st-century Lithuanian lawyers
21st-century Lithuanian politicians